Avarkhod is a village in Belgaum district in the southern state of Karnataka, India. famous for hanuman temple and grape is a backbone of avarkhod 

Hanuman temple  avarkhod

Demographics
Covering  and comprising 660 households at the time of the 2011 census of India, Avarkhod had a population of 3437. There were 1782 males and 1655 females, with 527 people being aged six or younger.

References

Villages in Belagavi district